Douglas or Doug Peterson may refer to:
 Douglas L. Peterson, American businessman
 Doug Peterson (yacht designer) (1945–2017), American yacht designer
 D. J. Peterson (baseball) (Douglas Anthony Peterson, born 1991), American baseball player
 Doug Peterson (Nebraska politician) (born 1959), American lawyer and politician in Nebraska
 Doug Peterson (Minnesota politician) (born 1948), American politician, member of the Minnesota House of Representatives
 Doug Peterson (cross-country skier) (born 1953), American cross-country skier
 Pete Peterson (Douglas Brian Peterson, born 1935), American politician and diplomat

See also
 Douglas W. Petersen (1948–2014), American politician in Massachusetts
 Doug Pederson (born 1968), American football coach